The A94 is a major road in Scotland, United Kingdom.

Route 
It connects Perth to Forfar. West of Forfar, the road is connected to the A90 via a grade-separated junction. It has a junction at Glamis.

History 
The A94 route number once extended north to Stonehaven, this stretch was renumbered to be part of the A90 in the 1990s.

See also
Glamis Castle
Eassie Stone

References

9-0094
9-0094
Transport in Angus, Scotland